The Longyangxia Dam is a concrete arch-gravity dam at the entrance of the Longyangxia canyon on the Yellow River in Gonghe County, Qinghai Province, China. The dam supports a 1,280 MW power station with 4 x 320 MW generators that can operate at a maximum capacity of 1400 MW. Controlling ice, the dam controls downstream releases to reservoirs lower in the river, allowing them to generate more power instead of mitigating ice.

The dam is composed of its main body and a gravity pier and secondary dam on both its left and right flank. Downstream discharges are also controlled by a similar single-chute middle outlet and the lower outlet works.

Photovoltaic power station
In 2013 a solar photovoltaic station was built with a nameplate capacity of 320 MWp (Phase I), covering .  An additional 530 MWp (Phase II) was completed in 2015, covering further , making Longyangxia Dam Solar Park, with 850 MWp capacity, one of the largest photovoltaic power stations in the world.

The solar power station is integrated with the hydroelectric power station. The park is coupled to one of the hydroelectric turbines, which automatically regulate the output to balance the variable generation from solar before dispatching power to the grid. This limits the problems connected to variable solar generation while helping to conserve water.

See also 

 List of power stations in China

References

Hydroelectric power stations in Qinghai
Dams in China
Dams on the Yellow River
Arch-gravity dams
Dams completed in 1992
Photovoltaic power stations in China
1992 establishments in China
Hainan Tibetan Autonomous Prefecture